In Afghanistan, there are more than 3,000 plant species, including many assortments of trees, bushes, vines, blossoms, and growths. The nation is especially wealthy in such therapeutic plants as regret, wormwood, and asafetida; products of the soil trees are found in numerous territories. Local fauna incorporate the fox, lynx, wild hound, bear, mongoose, vixen, hedgehog, hyena, jerboa, rabbit, and wild assortments of felines, asses, mountain goats, and mountain sheep. Trout is the most widely recognized fish. There are in excess of 100 types of wildfowl and feathered creatures.

Wildlife
The Caspian Tiger used to happen along the upper compasses of Hari-Rud close to Herat to the wildernesses in the lower spans of the stream until the mid 1970s.
In March 2017, fringe monitors captured and appropriated six white lions close to Kandahar at the outskirt to Pakistan. The starting point of the lions was vague at first, yet Border Police Commander-General Ne'matullah Haidari said that they were from Africa. In April 2017, four of the lions were taken to Kabul Zoo. The other two lions are still in Kandahar Province.
Vegetation in Afghanistan is scanty however various. Regular trees in the mountains are evergreens, oaks, poplars, wild hazelnuts, almonds, and pistachios. The fields of the north are to a great extent dry, treeless steppes, and those of the southwestern corner are about appalling deserts. Regular plants in the dry districts incorporate camel thistle, locoweed, prickly restharrow, mimosa, and wormwood, an assortment of sagebrush. The wild creatures of Afghanistan incorporate in excess of 100 warm blooded animal species, some of which are approaching elimination. The most genuinely imperiled are the goitered gazelle, panther, snow panther, markor goat, and Bactrian deer. Other wild creatures of Afghanistan incorporate Marco Polo sheep, urials, ibex, bears, wolves, foxes, hyenas, jackals, and mongooses. Wild pig, hedgehogs, wenches, bunnies, mouse rabbits, bats, and different rodents additionally happen. In excess of 380 flying creature species are found in Afghanistan, with in excess of 200 reproducing there. Flamingo and other oceanic fowl breed in the lake regions south and east of Ghazni.

References

External links 

 CNN (21 July 2011) Elusive snow leopards discovered in remote corner of Afghanistan